Husn Lal and Bhagat Ram were the first legendary music directors duo in Bollywood. They are two brothers, Husn Lal (8 April 1920 – 28 December 1968) and Bhagat Ram (1914 – 29 November 1973).

Husn Lal was also a renowned violinist, vocalist (indian classical music) and music composer, but his prowess as singer is not commonly known. Bhagat Ram was considered an expert harmonium player.

Bhagat Ram composed music for a few films in 1930s alone under the name "Bhagat Ram Batish". In 1944, he and Husn Lal joined forces for the first time to compose music for a film under the name Husn Lal - Bhagat Ram. The brothers were popular music composers in the 1940s and early 1950s, but their career waned after 1955.

Their oldest brother Pandit Amarnath was also a music composer of HMV and film music in the 1940s. These two great exponents trained music directors Shankar (of Shankar–Jaikishan), Laxmikant Shantaram Kudalkar (of Laxmikant–Pyarelal), Khayyam, the singer Mahendra Kapoor and the singer-composer S. Mohinder. The brothers were born in Kahma, Punjab, British India.

Filmography
Films to their credits include: 
 Chaand, 1944, by Prabhat Film Company, Pune 
 Mirza Sahiban (1947 film) (only music of this film was composed by all three – Pandit Amarnath (older cousin) and two brothers Husn Lal Bhagat Ram)
 Aaj Ki Raat (1948)
 Amar Kahani, 1949 
 Badi Bahen (1949)
 Balam (1949)
 Pyar Ki Jeet (1948)
 Aadhi Raat (1950)
 Meena Bazaar (film) (1950)
 Afsana (1951)
 Sanam (1951)
 Kaafilaa (1952)
 Shama Parwana (1954)
 Adl-e-Jehangir (1955 film)
 Shaheed Bhagat Singh (1963 film)
 Main Jatti Punjab Di (1964)- punjabi movie

Popular songs

The following is a short list of some of Husnlal Bhagatram's best compositions:

 Chale Jana Nahi  (Bari Behen)
 Chup Chup Khade Ho (Bari Behen)
 Woh Meri Taraf Yun Chale Aa Rahe - Kaafila
 Laharon Se puch lo - Kaafila
 Tere Nainon Ne Chori Kiya  (Pyar Ki Jeet)
 Kya Yehi Tera Pyar Tha  (Mirza Sahiban)
 Hath Sine Pe Jo Rakh Do To Qarar Aa Jaye  (Mirza Sahiban)
 O Pardesi Musafir, Kise Karta Hai Ishare (Balam)- A Rare Duet between Lata Mangeshkar and Suraiya
 Hume Duniya ko Dil ke jakhm (Aadhi Raat)
 O Mahi O Dupatta Mera Dede (Meena Bazaar)
 Apna Bana Ke Chhod Nahi Jana (Meena Bazaar)
 O Sanam, Main Tujhe Pukaarun SanamSanam (Sanam)
 Sham e Bahar ayi -Shama Parwana
 Abhi to main jawaan hoon (Afsana)- One of the best songs of Lata Mangeshkar, It was the title song of a popular program of the same titled on Radio Ceylon for years

See also
 Shankar Jaikishan

References

External links

Hindi film score composers
People from Jalandhar district
Indian musical duos
Harmonium players
20th-century composers
20th-century Indian musicians